Treasure of San Gennaro is a 1966 Italian comedy film starring Nino Manfredi, Senta Berger, Totò and Claudine Auger. It is directed by Dino Risi and is a funny classic story of a perfect robbery plan gone wrong in the Italian way. It was entered into the 5th Moscow International Film Festival where it won a Silver Prize.

Plot

In Italy in the Sixties, a gang of American thieves arrive in Naples to steal the famous Treasure of San Gennaro. However the Americans do not know how to move in the picturesque town, because for them the customs of the natives are too weird and incomprehensible. So the two men and the girl (the gang members) go to a prison, following the advice of a friend. There they would find, the man who would assist them in their case, a certain Don Vincenzo, who is a famous thief in the city. However, since he is known by everyone in the prison, he is treated by the guards as a gentleman and with respect. The Americans, when they see this type of treatment, which would be impossible in their country, are quite stunned. Don Vincenzo warmly receives them and advises them to go to Naples and look for a certain Armandino Girasole, known as "Dudù". He says that Dudù is a young thief by profession and he could help them. But the Americans, do not reveal to Don Vincenzo what they intend to steal. They meet Dudù and he  agrees to work with them.

During their various meetings to prepare the plan, the Americans witness the cheerfulness as well as the grotesque situation of the city of Naples, a symbol of Italy. Everyone whether rich or poor, thinks of nothing but amusement, taking care only to live life as best they can. In fact, the economic boom occurred in Italy during these years. Jack, the leader of the gang, views Dudù's behavior as unacceptable. In fact, although he is known throughout the city as a professional thief, friend of even the cops, he behaves in a manner completely flippant. According to Jack, Dudù should show at least some seriousness and study the plan at his seaside villa. Instead, Dudù tells Jack that can not study the plan because one of his own gang members has to go to the football game, and another must attend a wedding or christening and also celebrate at the evening's huge banquet. While other colleagues are having fun, Jack is frustrated because, he thinks, one does not agree to commit a robbery with adults who act like children. During the wedding banquet in which Dudù is also invited, the Americans, to their surprise, also meet the prisoner Don Vincenzo who was released from the prison for the day only to join the party! Jack has had enough but he must also contend with his friend Joe, who was seated at the table to taste a delicious plate of mussels, a typical Italian dish almost unknown in America. Joe, gorged himself on the mussels. Unfortunately, he dies from indigestion.

After the funeral Jack thinks of giving up the job, but eventually convinces himself to again give the plan a shot. Without him noticing, however, his girlfriend Maggie slowly begins to fall in love with Dudù. The day before the famous heist, Dudù and the rest of his gang, including his right arm man Sciascillo, meet in his villa by the sea. Jack, on the verge of losing patience, orders the fool Sciascillo to guard the house and not let anyone disturb him during the discussion of the plan. Unfortunately Sciascillo falls asleep yet every five minutes or so he wakes up and enters the house, trying to sell fake watches and other junk like that. Jack, unable to contain the absurdity of Naples, comes out of the house with a gun in his hand and starts to chase Sciascillo while shooting.

The plan is complete but on the last day Dudù and his gang go to the Cathedral of San Gennaro to pray to the saint so that he will not become angry by the theft. Dudù, since he knows the real reason for the heist, is very concerned because he does not want to betray his country, and especially his favorite saint. However, he also speaks with Don Vincenzo, who is again free, and tells him that he will give part of the Treasure of San Gennaro to charities. All are convinced finally to do the job that night, but it soon turns into a mess.

In fact, Dudù has just forgotten that night in Italy would begin the celebration of the Song Festival of Naples. An event so famous all over the country and should not be taken so lightly in Naples: people will come out to the streets to comment on the various songs and celebrate in bars. Jack and Maggie, as Americans, do not understand the huge fuss that would be created in the streets of Naples. So Dudù and Sciascillo think to providing the nearby houses and even the police stations with TVs to keep them off the streets. Once they've carried out the task, Dudù can now work, until the end of the festival, as best he can. In the catacombs of the cathedral and in the channels of the sewers, he smashes all the protective walls with dynamite, but there is one last concrete wall to break through. Unfortunately, however, the hole made in the wall to put the TNT is too small, so Dudù has an idea: an idea that would not come to anyone else except to an Italian. He grabs a rat and binds the TNT to it, making him run away in a hole which leads behind the wall, soon the explosion breaks down the wall. Now, finally, the three can access the treasure room of San Gennaro and after a few attempts to break through the strong crystal display case, they finally are successful and remove the treasure.
The next day Dudù learns that Jack is dead, betrayed and killed by his partner Maggie, who, he learns, wants to fly back to America with the treasure. Dudù must prevent or rather delay the departure of the aircraft. Who to contact if not Don Vincenzo? Dudù calls his friend at the prison, and requests he phone a friend of his at the airport and to delay the departure of the flight to the United States. Don Vincenzo, with absolute calm, replied that delaying the flight of a plane is not something unimportant, but reassures him that he will do everything possible. His friend at the airport agrees help. Dudù rushes to the airport and tries to find Maggie, who is disguised as a nun to avoid recognition. Without being discovered, Dudù, in the guise of a porter, starts to open Maggie's checked bags, trying to find the treasure. In fact, Maggie is wearing all the jewels on herself, fearing that her baggage could be seized. She assumes she has fooled everyone in Italy, but Sciascillo and Dudù are smarter than her and thus take back the treasure from her, returning the Treasure of San Gennaro to Naples.  Though Dudu attempts to take the treasure for himself, he is picked up by a Cardinal in a car after Mamma Assunta tells the Cardinal that Dudu was 'recovering' the jewels, and Dudu is greeted as a public hero when he returns to Naples, with the jewels returned to Saint Gennaro.

Cast
 Nino Manfredi as Armandino Girasole
 Senta Berger as Maggie
 Harry Guardino as Jack
 Claudine Auger as Concettina
 Totò as Don Vincenzo
 Mario Adorf as Sciascillo
 Ugo Fangareggi as Agonia
 Dante Maggio as Il capitano
 Giovanni Bruti as Il cardinale
 Pinuccio Ardia as Il barone
 Vittoria Crispo as Mamma assunta
 Ralf Wolter as Frank

References

External links
 

1966 films
1966 comedy films
Italian comedy films
Italian heist films
1960s Italian-language films
Films directed by Dino Risi
Films scored by Armando Trovajoli
Films set in Naples
1960s heist films
1960s Italian films